Hamburger Mary's Bar & Grille is a drag-themed burger restaurant chain that started in San Francisco, California, in 1972. The eateries are often in gayborhoods and are intended to represent stereotypical gay culture through humorously named menu items, flamboyant decor and many of their locations hosting drag shows on weekends. "Mary" in the name is a reference to the slang descriptor "Mary" used for gay men as far back as the early 1900s.

There are 18 Hamburger Mary's in the U.S. and one in Berlin, Germany as of 2015 (closed). Their Portland, Oregon location closed in April 2013 due to a landlord dispute. Their Denver, Colorado location has relocated to 1336 E 17th Ave.  Their main offices are in Chicago and West Hollywood, as of 2013.

U.S. locations are sited in California (Long Beach, Ontario, West Hollywood, San Francisco), Colorado (Denver), Florida (Clearwater, Jacksonville, Orlando), Illinois (two locations in Chicago, Oak Park), Michigan (Grand Rapids, Ypsilanti), Missouri (Kansas City and St. Louis (closed), Nevada (Las Vegas), Texas (Houston), Wisconsin (Milwaukee), and Ohio (Toledo).

Hamburger Mary's was featured in the "Grand Finale" of the first season of RuPaul's Drag Race All Stars.

References

External links
 
 History 

Restaurants established in 1972
1972 establishments in California
Food and drink in the San Francisco Bay Area
Restaurant chains in the United States
Restaurant franchises
Defunct LGBT drinking establishments in Oregon
American companies established in 1972